Barry William Dominey (21 October 1955 – 22 March 2005) was an English footballer who played as a defender in the Football League for Colchester United. Considered a good prospect as a teenager, his career stuttered at an early age and he quickly slipped out of the Football League and played for Yeovil Town and Dorchester Town.

Career

Dominey, born in Edmonton, London, joined Colchester United from Enfield WMC, making his U's and Football League debut on 16 April 1974 during a 0–0 away draw with Brentford, coming on as a substitute for Paul Taylor. He scored his first Colchester goal in a 1–0 League Cup fourth round replay at The Dell against Southampton which proved to be the crucial winning goal, taking the U's through to the quarter-finals of the competition. Dominey would go on to score three league goals in 71 appearances for the club. He made his final appearance in a Colchester shirt on 21 January 1977 in a 1–0 home defeat to Cambridge United. He would later play for Yeovil Town and Dorchester Town. Barry Dominey died aged 49 on 22 March 2005.

References

1955 births
2005 deaths
Footballers from Edmonton, London
English footballers
Association football defenders
Colchester United F.C. players
Yeovil Town F.C. players
Dorchester Town F.C. players
English Football League players